

Fieberiellini is a tribe of leafhoppers in the subfamily Deltocephalinae. In the review by Zahniser & Dietrich (2013) it includes 48 species placed in 10 genera. Species in this tribe are native to the Palaearctic region, mainly the southern parts, with some being adventive in the Nearctic. The Cherry Leafhopper (Fieberiella florii) is a vector of several phytoplasma diseases including Cherry X Disease.

Genera
There are currently 10 described genera of Fieberiellini:
 Cechenotettix Ribaut, 1942
 Docotettix Ribaut, 1948
 Dohukia Meyer-Arndt & Remane, 1992
 Ericotettix Lindberg, 1960
 Fieberiella Signoret, 1880
 Habrostis Dubovsky, 1966
 Heliotettix Rodrigues, 1968
 Parafieberiella Dlabola, 1974
 Placotettix Ribaut, 1942
 Synophropsis Haupt, 1926

References

External links

 
Deltocephalinae
Hemiptera tribes